BioOne is a nonprofit publisher of scientific research.

BioOne was established in 1999 in Washington, DC, as a 501(c)(3) not-for-profit organization by five scholarly collaborators: the American Institute of Biological Sciences, the Scholarly Publishing and Academic Resources Coalition (SPARC), The University of Kansas, Greater Western Library Alliance, and Allen Press.

The main impetus for BioOne's creation was the common desire amongst key scholarly stakeholders for an alternative to commercial scholarly publishing.

Half of the subscription fee revenue from BioOne Complete is divided between participating publishers.

See also
List of academic databases and search engines

References 

Bibliographic databases and indexes
Academic publishing companies
Bibliographic database providers
Organizations established in 2000
Full-text scholarly online databases
Ecological databases
English-language journals